Not to Forget is a 2021 American drama film written and directed by Valerio Zanoli and starring Karen Grassle, Tate Dewey, Kevin Hardesty, Louis Gossett Jr., Tatum O'Neal, George Chakiris, Cloris Leachman and Olympia Dukakis, the latter two in their final film appearances.

Cast
Olympia Dukakis as Judge
Tate Dewey as Chris
Karen Grassle as Melody
Louis Gossett Jr. as Pastor John
Tatum O'Neal as Doctor
Cloris Leachman as Donna
George Chakiris as Bank Manager
Kevin Hardesty as Joe

Release
The film was released in theaters on November 26, 2021.

Reception
The film has a 62% rating on Rotten Tomatoes based on thirteen reviews.

Bob Bloom of the Journal & Courier awarded the film two and a half stars out of four and wrote, "Not to Forget follows a familiar path as it intermingles its faith-based message with a look at the ravages and emotional toll of Alzheimer’s disease."

Tara McNamara of Common Sense Media awarded the film two stars out of five.

Alan Ng of Film Threat rated the film a 7 out of 10 and wrote, "With the proper expectations set, Not to Forget delivers on its promise of light family drama."

References

External links
 
 

2020s English-language films